Benny Nelson Napoleon, J.D. (September 10, 1955 – December 17, 2020) was an American attorney, law enforcement officer, and politician who served as the Sheriff of Wayne County, Michigan. He was also a 2013 candidate for the office of Mayor of Detroit.

Early life and education 
Born in Detroit in 1955, he was one of seven children of his mother, Betty, and  father, Harry Napoleon, who was a minister. Napoleon graduated from Cass Technical High School. He earned a Bachelor's degree from University of Detroit Mercy and Juris Doctor from the Detroit College of Law.

Career 
Napoleon entered the Detroit Police Department in 1975.He was also a member of the Detroit Police basketball team that played in International Police tournaments in Ontario Canada in 1978-1980. He served as police chief from 1998 to 2001 under Dennis Archer. In 2004, he was made Assistant Wayne County Executive, and in 2009, he became Wayne County Sheriff.

2013 Detroit Mayoral election

A Democrat, Napoleon entered Detroit politics in 2013, announcing his intentions to run for mayor in the city's non-partisan primary to replace Dave Bing, who announced he would not seek re-election after the appointment of an emergency manager for the city. During the primary campaign, he referred to himself as a "businessman with a badge". Napoleon placed second in the primary despite his most serious competition, former Wayne County Prosecutor and Detroit Medical Center CEO Mike Duggan having to run as a write-in candidate, and lost the mayoral race to Mike Duggan on November 5, 2013.

FBI investigation
In December 2017, the Detroit Free Press obtained FBI wiretap transcripts that were unsealed in U.S. District Court. The investigation is linked to a corruption case against Gasper Fiore, the owner of Boulevard & Trumbull Towing, a large City of Detroit contractor. In December 2017, Fiore entered into a plea agreement with the U.S. Attorney's Office, in which he agreed to plead guilty to conspiracy to commit federal program bribery.

According to court documents, the government has probable cause that Fiore and 17 other targets were involved in several crimes, including: extortion, wire fraud, bribery, and conspiracy to distribute marijuana. FBI Special Agent Robert Beeckman wrote in a wire tap request document reviewed by the Detroit News that "Evidence has been gathered showing that crimes involving corruption have been committed by some of the target subjects, including Napoleon." No charges were ever filed on Mr. Napoleon.

Illness and death 
In November 2020, it was announced that Napoleon had tested positive for COVID-19 during the COVID-19 pandemic in Michigan. He was admitted to a local hospital on November 21 and placed on a ventilator. On December 17, after various sources reported that Napoleon had died, his family released a statement on Facebook that Napoleon remained in stable condition. Napoleon died later on December 17, 2020.

References

External links

1955 births
2020 deaths
21st-century American politicians
African-American businesspeople
African-American people in Michigan politics
African-American sheriffs
Businesspeople from Detroit
Candidates in the 2013 United States elections
Cass Technical High School alumni
Deaths from the COVID-19 pandemic in Michigan
Detroit Police Department chiefs
Lawyers from Detroit
Michigan Democrats
Politicians from Detroit
Sheriffs of Wayne County, Michigan
University of Detroit Mercy alumni
21st-century African-American people